Brayden Coombs (born October 24, 1986) is an American football coach who was the special teams coordinator for the Detroit Lions of the National Football League (NFL). He spent his first 10 years coaching with the Cincinnati Bengals after playing in college for the Miami RedHawks. He had been one of the youngest coordinators in the NFL at age 34.

Playing career 
Coombs lettered four times as a defensive back and wide receiver at Miami (Ohio) University from 2005-2009.

Coaching
On January 11, 2020 the Detroit Lions announced the hiring of Braydon Coombs as their Special Teams Coordinator.
On December 21, 2020 the Lions fired Brayden Coombs after reportedly going rogue on fake punt by calling the play without the knowledge or consent of interim head coach Darrell Bevell

Family
Brayden and his wife have a daughter and two sons. He is the son of former Ohio State defensive coordinator Kerry Coombs.

References

External links
 Brayden Coombs Detroit Lions coaching profile

Cincinnati Bengals coaches
Detroit Lions coaches
Living people
1986 births
Players of American football from Cincinnati
American football wide receivers